The Abortion Pill is a 1997 documentary that examines the pros and cons of a Mifepristone (RU486), a drug that can end pregnancy without surgery. The film was produced and directed by Marion Lipschutz and Rose Rosenblatt of Incite Pictures.

Awards
 Chicago International Film Festival's annual award for a social/political documentary

External links
 
 Incite Pictures - Production Company Site

1997 films
Sexuality and society
Documentary films about abortion
1997 documentary films